A Century is Not Enough: My Roller-coaster Ride to Success (2018) is an English autobiography written by former Indian cricketer and captain Sourav Ganguly with Gautam Bhattacharya. The book was first published by Juggernaut on 24 February 2018.

Plot 
In this book Ganguly discussed his cricketing career in details. He has discussed different phases of his cricketing career including several foreign tours, World Cups, and IPL.

References 

2018 non-fiction books
Indian autobiographies
21st-century Indian books
Sports autobiographies
Juggernaut Books books